Jennifer Dias (born 1985) is a Cape Verdean singer. She sings in Cape Verdean Creole, Portuguese, French and English.

She released her first single titled "" in 2009; two years later, she released "Control". A year later, she sang "" with Nelson Freitas and "". In 2013, she released her album  (Portuguese for 'strength', also in French). In 2015, she released an English language single named "I Need You So". In 2016, she made a remix titled "Sorry remix kizomba"; later she sang "" ("Tonight") and "".

Discography

Album
Forte (2013)
 Tous ces mots
 Amor Special (Feat. Dj Zayx)
 Viens danser
 Play With My Emotions
 Louca por ti
 Pourquoi
 Apaixonada
 Deixam em paz
 Forte
 Je t'emmène
 Mama Africa (feat. D. Lopes)
 PS : Je pense à toi
 Reste avec moi
 Je t'aime
 Solução (Portuguese: Solution)
 Number 2
 Control (Afro house club remix)
 Control (Afro house lounge remix)

Singles
Kel ki um kré (2009)
Control (2011)
Deixam em paz [Portuguese: Heading to Peace] (sur le remix, feat. Nelson Freitas) (2012)
 Viens danser (2012)
Je t'emmène (2013)
Louca por ti (2013)
Reste avec moi [French: Rest With Me] (2013)
Mama Africa (feat. D. Lopes) (2013)
Femme fatale 5 (feat. Milca) (2014)
I Need You So (2015)
Sorry remix kizomba (2016)
Ce soir [French: Tonight] (2016)
Dança Ma Mi (2016)
Roçaré feat. Dabanda (2018)
Sentimento Incrível [Portuguese: Incredible Feeling'] (2018)Acerta  feat. Mika Mendes (2018)Loco  feat. Elji Beatzkilla (2019) videoclipe filmed in the Custom Café, a Nirvana Studios theater. Eu Te Odeio '' (2019)

Collaboration
Taliixo Beatz feat. Jennifer Dias - So Meu (2017)

References

External links

1985 births
Living people
21st-century Cape Verdean women singers
Kizomba singers
Cape Verdean emigrants to France
21st-century French women singers